The 2000 Yale Bulldogs football team represented Yale University in the 2000 NCAA Division I-AA football season.  The Bulldogs were led by fourth-year head coach Jack Siedlecki, played their home games at the Yale Bowl and finished third in the Ivy League with a 4–3 record, 7–3 overall. Yale averaged 23,136 fans per game.

Schedule

Roster

References

Yale
Yale Bulldogs football seasons
Yale Bulldogs football